Yohan may refer to:

Yohan (name), a masculine given name 
Yohan: The Child Wanderer, Norwegian/English family film from 2010
Yohan, a Greek cargo ship involved in a collision with the F174 during a human smuggling operation off Sicily on Christmas night, 1996.
Yohan, a singer in Korean pop group TST

See also